Patrick Osborne (born 14 June 1987) is a Fijian rugby union footballer. He plays as a winger for Kubota Spears in the Japanese Top League. He attended Holy Trinity Anglican School before spending his secondary school education at Jai Narayan College and Queen Victoria School.

Playing career

Osborne made his ITM Cup debut for Canterbury against Hawke's Bay in 2010, and became a regular starter for the province the following year. His strong performances earned him a contract with the  squad for the 2012 Super Rugby season, but he didn't make any appearances in the competition.
He finished the Chiefs' title-winning season with two tries from 9 appearances, including 4 starts.

Osborne was regular started in the 2014 season but with some injuries he was out for a few weeks. Osborne scored his first try for the Highlanders against the Blues on his debut for the team.

He has made the All Blacks training side twice in 2014 and 2015 but was never selected. In May 2016, he dashed his All Blacks dream and made himself available for the Fiji. He also signed on to play for Kubota Spears in the Japanese Top League but would return to play for the Highlanders.

In June 2016, he was included in the Fiji team for the June tests against Tonga and Samoa in the 2016 World Rugby Pacific Nations Cup as well as the one-off test against Georgia.

References

External links 
itsrugby.co.uk profile

Living people
1987 births
Fijian rugby union players
Crusaders (rugby union) players
Canterbury rugby union players
Rugby union wings
Fijian emigrants to New Zealand
Chiefs (rugby union) players
Highlanders (rugby union) players
Sportspeople from Suva
Fijian people of British descent
New Zealand people of British descent
Kubota Spears Funabashi Tokyo Bay players
Expatriate rugby union players in Japan
Fiji international rugby union players